The 1973–74 FA Trophy was the fifth season of the FA Trophy.

Preliminary round

Ties

First qualifying round

Ties

Replays

2nd replay

Second qualifying round

Ties

Replays

2nd replay

Third qualifying round

Ties

Replays

2nd replay

1st round
The teams that given byes to this round are Scarborough, Stafford Rangers, Barrow, Telford United, Macclesfield Town, Hillingdon Borough, Wimbledon, Worcester City, Romford, Weymouth, Yeovil Town, Wigan Athletic, Bangor City, Kidderminster Harriers, Bromsgrove Rovers, Burscough, Chelmsford City, Barnet, Grantham, Buxton, Burton Albion, Bedford Town, Dover, Hastings United, Stourbridge, Dartford, South Liverpool, Chorley, Ilkeston Town, Morecambe, Ashford Town (Kent) and Bexley United.

Ties

Replays

2nd replay

2nd round

Ties

Replays

3rd round

Ties

Replays

4th round

Ties

Replays

Semi finals

First leg

Second leg

Final

References

General
 Football Club History Database: FA Trophy 1973-74

Specific

1973–74 domestic association football cups
1973-74
1973–74 in English football